Wild Horse Valley is a 1940 American Western film directed by Ira Webb and starring Bob Steele, Phyllis Adair and Lafe McKee.

Synopsis
After his stallion is stolen, Bob Evans and his sidekick pursue the horse thieves.

Cast
 Bob Steele as Bob Evans
 Phyllis Adair as Ann Kimball
 Lafe McKee as Elmer Kimball
 Jimmy Aubrey as Shag Williams
 Ted Adams as Baker - Ranch Foreman
 Bud Osborne as Henchman Winton
 George Chesebro as Henchman Raymer
 Buzz Barton as Cowhand Joe
 Victor Adamson as Henchman

References

Bibliography
 Pitts, Michael R. Western Movies: A Guide to 5,105 Feature Films. McFarland, 2012.

External links
 

1940 films
1940 Western (genre) films
American Western (genre) films
1940s English-language films
1940s American films